Annona angustifolia is a species of plant in the Annonaceae family. It is native to Brazil. Jacques Huber, the Swiss-Brazilian botanist who first formally described the species, named it after its narrow ( in Latin) leaves ( in Latin).

Description
It is a bush with slender branches. Its leaves are arranged in two opposite rows on the branches.  Its narrow, smooth, membranous leaves are 6-12 centimeter by 1.2-1.5 centimeters. Its solitary flowers are on 1 centimeter long pedicels that have a small bracteole about half way up from their base. Its triangular sepals are 2 by 3 millimeters, come to a tapering point at their tips, and are covered in short rust-colored hairs.  Its thick exterior petals are round, 1.5 by 1.5 centimeters, concave, and have rust-colored hairs on their inner surface.  Its inner petals are thinner, come to a sharp point a their tips and are 8 millimeters long. Its flowers have numerous stamens with filaments that are about 0.5 millimeters long, and 1.5 millimeter long, yellow anthers.  The tissue connecting the lobes of the anther forms a cap like structure at its top. Its flowers have numerous ovaries with silky yellow styles and white stigmas.

Reproductive biology
The pollen of Annona angustifolia is shed as permanent tetrads.

Distribution and habitat
It grows in forested areas.

References

External links
 

angustifolia
Plants described in 1909
Flora of Brazil
Taxa named by Jacques Huber